Cymothoe consanguis, the cream glider, is a butterfly in the  family Nymphalidae. It is found in Nigeria (the Cross River loop) and Cameroon. The habitat consists of forests.

Adults feed on fallen fruit.

References

Butterflies described in 1896
Cymothoe (butterfly)
Butterflies of Africa
Taxa named by Per Olof Christopher Aurivillius